Chinthamani is a part in Madurai, in the Indian state of Tamil Nadu. The town comes under the Thirupparangundram constituency.

Location 

It is located 4 km South of Madurai headquarters, 9 km from Tirupparangunram. 492 km from State capital Chennai. Madurai Airport is located in 1.5 km from Chinthamani. Anuppanadi ( 1 km ), Sourastra Teachers Colony ( 1 km ), Keerathurai ( 1 km ), Villapuram ( 2 km ), Rajamaan Nagar ( 2 km ) are the nearby villages. Thirupuvanam, Thirumangalam, Sholavandan are the nearby Cities to Chinthamani. Sub Villages in Chinthamani are Ayyanarpuram, Burmacolony, Kajendrapuram, Kannan Colony.

Politics 

In 2011, Chinthamani joined with Madurai Corporation and it is under the third Mandalam of Madurai Corporation. Chinthamani is the 56th ward in Madurai Corporation. Its Lokshabha Constituency is Virudhunagar and its Vidhan Sabha constituency is Tirupparangunram. Chinthamani is famous for Appalam production. More number of appalam production small scale industries are functioning in the chinthamani village.

References 

Villages in Madurai district